is a Japanese manga written and illustrated by Miki Araya. It is licensed in North America by Digital Manga Publishing, which released the manga on 29 January 2008.

Reception
Leroy Douresseaux enjoyed the "comic" and "over the top" tone of the manga, describing it as a Hollywood-style romantic comedy. Briana Lawrence felt the art was overdramatic and that the story had too much going on at once, and that the humour was forced. Holly Ellingwood found the story "sexy and hilarious".

References

External links

2002 manga
Yaoi anime and manga
Digital Manga Publishing titles